Sairandhari is a 1933 Indian film based on an episode from the Mahabharata and directed by V. Shantaram. The film was a bilingual made  as Sairandhari in both Marathi and Hindi. Produced by Prabhat Film Company, it has been cited as one of the 21 "most wanted missing Indian treasures" by P K. Nair, the National Film Archive of India founder. The music composer was Govindrao Tembe. The cast included Master Vinayak, Leela, Prabhavati, Shakuntala, G.R. Mane, Nimbalkar and Shankarrao Bhosle.

It is the first Indian colour film. The film was shot on Agfa B&W 35-mm negative. The release prints were made in Germany by Bipack colour printing process.

The film revolved around an incident from the Mahabharata and told the story of Draupadi as Malini/Sairandhari (female servant), the  thirteenth identity she took in order to remain safe and hidden from the Kauravas.

Plot
The story is about the twelfth of the thirteen years of the Pandavas exile. Draupadi in her identity as Sairandhari (female servant) is acting as the maid-in-waiting to Queen Sudeshna. They are in King Virata's palace in Matsya. Kichaka, King Virata's brother-in-law and Sudeshna's brother is an arrogant man who believes that King Virat rules his kingdom because of him. He sees Sairandhari and orders his sister to send Sairandhari to his palace. When she reaches Keechak's palace Bhima who is disguised as the palace cook, arrives to save her and slays Kichaka.

Cast
 Master Vinayak as King Virat
 Leela as Sairandhari
 Mane
 Nimbalkar as Keechak
 Shakuntala
 Prabhavati
 Kulkarni
 Bhonsle
 Salunke

Production
Shantaram had been impressed by the "technical virtuosity" in films of Pabst, Lang, and Max Ophuls. Sairandhari was made in colour but for processing Shantaram took it to the UFA studios in Germany. However, the technique failed and the film was released as a Black-and-white production as the colours turned out to be too garish. The film was stated as the first Indian colour film, the processing was done in Germany. Even though a good reaction was expected for this colour film - the processing of the negatives was messed up by the lab in Germany causing the colours to be too garish. The audience rejected the film and it played for less than a week.

The film is also credited as having the first original soundtrack disc. The Gramaphone Records were "pressed" from the original soundtrack in Germany.

Remake
It was remade as Keechak Vadh in 1959, starring Shobhana Samarth, Helen, Baburao Pendharkar.

Draupadi in films
The film was a remake of the earlier silent film Sairandhari (1920) made by Baburao Painter and the remake of Prabhat's original Keechak Vadhan (1928). Draupadi, a "mythological image" and an oppressed figure was used as a nationalistic representative for India under the British Raj. The several films made from 1916 to 1944 using Draupadi were:

 Keechak Vadham (1916)
 Draupadi Vastaharan (1920)
 Sairandhari (1920)
 Draupadi Swayamvar (1922)
 Draupadi's Fate (1924)
 Draupadi Vastaharan (1927)
 Draupadi Vastaharan (1928)
 Keechakvadh (1928)
 Draupadi (1931) Talkie
 Sairandhari (1933)
 Draupadi (1944)

Soundtrack
Hindi Soundtrack

References

External links

1933 films
1930s color films
1930s Marathi-language films
1930s Hindi-language films
Prabhat Film Company films
Films directed by V. Shantaram
1933 multilingual films
Indian multilingual films